Greece competed at the 2013 European Athletics Indoor Championships in Gothenburg, Sweden, from 1-3 March 2013 with a team of 12 athletes.

Results

See also
Greece at the European Athletics Indoor Championships

References

2013
European Athletics Championships